The 2008 congressional elections in Virginia were held on November 4, 2008 to determine who would represent the Commonwealth of Virginia in the United States House of Representatives, coinciding with the presidential and senatorial elections. Representatives are elected for two-year terms; those elected served in the 111th Congress from January 3, 2009 until January 3, 2011. Primary elections were held on June 10, 2008.

Virginia has eleven seats in the House, apportioned according to the 2000 United States Census. Democrats flipped the 2nd, 5th, and 11th districts, flipping their 3-8 deficit into a 6-5 majority. As of 2022, this is the last time Democrats won the 5th or 9th congressional district

Overview

Match-up summary

District 1

The candidates appeared on Cathy Lewis's TV program, What Matters, on October 15. The candidates held a spirited and well-attended debate on October 22 in which differing opinions on health care and the economy played a central role. Wittman defended his vote against the bailout package, while Day said he would have voted for it, and Larson said that it would have been better for the economy if the banks had been allowed to fail. On Medicare, Wittman advocated restructuring the system, while Day argued for expanding it and Larson shocked the audience by calling for its abolition. Wittman won the election.

Incumbent Rob Wittman was the Republican nominee. A Westmoreland County resident, former State Board of Health field director for the Division of Shellfish Sanitation and past member of the Virginia House of Delegates, he has only held the seat since January 2008, having won the special election to succeed deceased Congresswoman Jo Ann Davis. He has taken up many of her causes, including the FairTax, veterans' interests and getting rid of the remainder of the ghost fleet stationed at the James River. Like Davis, he is also introducing legislation to allow Virginia to regulate the importation of trash from other states.

Bill Day was the Democratic nominee. He previously ran for Virginia Delegate representing the 31st District, losing to Scott Lingamfelter by a close margin of 45% to 55%.

Day earned a bachelor's degree in construction from Arizona State University in 1974, an MBA from Harvard in 1983, and a master's degree in counseling from West Virginia State University in 1991.  He used to live in Fauquier County where he worked as a mental health counselor.  Day was very active in the community, and volunteered with Habitat for Humanity in both Fauquier and Prince William County, and Mend A House in Prince William County.  Day is an advocate of energy independence and renewable energy technologies.

The Democratic Party of Virginia held its convention on May 17 in Williamsburg, Virginia and selected Keith Hummel, the only person running for the Democratic nomination at the time. Only four votes were cast to not nominate anyone. A Westmoreland County physician and self-described "populist Democrat", Hummel also operates a farm and winery. The issues he was running on included enacting trade and tax policies to protect American jobs and American interests (rather than those of a few multinational corporations); using the military for defense rather than offensively; providing better health care and other benefits to veterans; and universal health care.

Anarcho-capitalist Catlett resident Nathan Larson filed a declaration of candidacy on May 7, and was certified for the ballot on June 6. He was nominated by the Libertarian Party 1st Congressional District Convention on June 3 and endorsed by the Independent Greens of Virginia on June 12. The main issues he was running on are free market roads and transit privatization, which he proposed as the solution to DC Metropolitan area traffic congestion, recently ranked the second-worst in the country. He supported auctioning off the Interstate Highway System and rail systems such as Amtrak to private investors.  Larson also sought to dissolve the U.S. military and establish a competitive market for defense services. Prior to his campaign, Larson was a student senator and cannabis reform activist at George Mason University.

District 2

The District includes Virginia's two largest cities--Norfolk and Virginia Beach, and the Virginia portion of the Eastern Shore. Republican incumbent Thelma Drake lost to Democratic nominee Glenn Nye, a graduate of the School of Foreign Service at Georgetown University in Washington, D.C., who served as a diplomat in Eastern Europe, Kosovo and Macedonia, Singapore, Afghanistan, the West Bank, Gaza and Iraq.

In 2006, Drake survived a bid from Democrat Phil Kellam by only 51.27% to 48.45%. In 2004, Drake received 55% of the vote in this Virginia Beach-based district, which was won by George W. Bush with 57% to 42% for John Kerry in 2004. But in 2005 Democratic Governor Tim Kaine won the district by 50% to 47%. In 2006, Drake may have been hurt by the downfall of Republican U.S. Senator George Allen, who narrowly lost to Democrat Jim Webb, an ex-Republican and former Navy Secretary under Ronald Reagan. (Allen carried the district 51%–48%.)

Analysts: CQ Politics rated the seat "Leans Republican".  The Cook Political Report rated it "Republican Toss Up". The Rothenberg Political Report rated it as "Toss-Up/Tilt Republican". The Democratic Congressional Campaign Committee considered Drake a "targeted Republican".
Race ranking and details from CQ Politics
Campaign contributions from OpenSecrets
Drake (R-i) vs Nye (D) graph of poll results at Pollster.com
Cirous, Greg Dems’ Dreams of Virginia House Seat Takeover Closer to Reality CQ Politics, October 12, 2008

District 3

The District runs from Hampton Roads to Richmond. Democratic incumbent Robert C. Scott won unopposed. The Republican Party of Virginia did not listed any prospective opponent.

Analysts: CQ Politics rates the seat "safe Democrat".

History: Scott won re-election with 96% of the vote in 2006.  That year Democrat Webb carried 68% of the district in his Senate race.  In 2005 Democrat Tim Kaine won the district by 71% to 27% in his gubernatorial race.
Race ranking and details from CQ Politics
Campaign contributions from OpenSecrets

District 4

The District lies in southeastern Virginia. Republican incumbent Randy Forbes won against Democratic nominee Andrea Miller (campaign website).

Analysts: CQ Politics rates the seat "safe Republican".

History: Forbes won with 76% of the vote in 2006. That year Democrat Webb lost the district 45%–54% in his Senate race. In 2005 Democrat Tim Kaine lost the district by 48.3% to 49.6% in his gubernatorial race.
Race ranking and details from CQ Politics
Campaign contributions from OpenSecrets

District 5

The District lies in southern and central Virginia. Democratic nominee Tom Perriello is the winner against Republican incumbent Virgil Goode. A recount was conducted and Perriello was finally certified  as the winner by 727 of 316,893 votes on December 17, 2008.

Analysts: CQ Politics rated the seat "Leans Republican".<ref>Race to Watch: U.S. House, Virginia - 5th District  CQ Politics</ref> The Democratic Congressional Campaign Committee considered Goode a "targeted Republican", based partly on Perriello's early fundraising.  On August 1, the DCCC named Perriello as one of its Red to Blue candidates.

History: Goode won re-election with 59% of the vote in 2006. That year Democrat Webb lost the district 45%–54% in his Senate race.  In 2005 Democrat Tim Kaine won the district by 49.6% to 48.4% in his gubernatorial race.  Goode originally won his seat as a Democrat in 1996, voted for President Clinton's impeachment in 1998, became an Independent in 2000, and then joined the Republican Party in 2002.  He became the first Republican to represent the district since 1889.
Race ranking and details from CQ Politics
Campaign contributions from OpenSecrets
Goode (R-i) vs Perriello (D) graph of poll results at Pollster.comDistrict 6

The District lies in western Virginia. Republican incumbent Bob Goodlatte won against Democratic nominee Sam Rasoul (campaign website) and Independent Janice Lee Allen (campaign website ).

Analysts: CQ Politics rates the seat "safe Republican".

History: Goodlatte won with 75% of the vote in 2006.  That year Democrat Webb lost the district 40%–58% in his Senate race.  In 2005 Democrat Tim Kaine lost the district by 44% to 53% in his gubernatorial race.
Race ranking and details from CQ Politics
Campaign contributions from OpenSecrets

District 7

The 7th District included western parts of Richmond, as well as its nearby suburbs in Henrico County, but otherwise is largely rural. CQ Politics rates the seat "Safe Republican". The Cook Political Report rates it "Solid Republican".

Incumbent Eric Cantor was the Republican nominee. He has held the seat since January 2001, having won in the U.S. House Elections of 2000 to succeed retiring Congressman Thomas J. Bliley, Jr. Cantor won the district in 2006 by 64% to 34%. Eric Cantor won the election, keeping this seat under republican control.

Anita Hartke was the Democratic candidate. Mrs. Hartke, 48, is a resident of Amissville, Virginia in Culpeper County, though the town is primarily located in neighboring Rappahannock County. She is the daughter of the three-term US Senator from Indiana, Vance Hartke. Her stated positions include improvements on the National Energy Policy by investing in alternative energy in order to reduce the use of foreign oil and fossil fuels. She believes that this would create more jobs that could not be outsourced while simultaneously fighting global warming. She also supports universal health care. Concerning the Iraq War, Hartke supports a gradual withdrawal of troops, stating that a brigade should be brought home every month. She supports reform of the controversial No Child Left Behind Act and increasing funding to the public school system. She also hopes to end student college loan rates in excess of 20%.

District 8

The District lies in heavily suburban Northern Virginia. Democratic incumbent Jim Moran won against Republican nominee Mark Ellmore and Independent Green J. Ron Fisher.

In the June 10, 2008, primary elections, Moran defeated Matthew T. Famiglietti, with 87% of the vote.  Ellmore won against Amit Singh, by 56% to 44%.

Analysts: CQ Politics rates the seat "safe Democrat".

History: Moran won by 66%–31% in 2006.  That year Democrat Webb won the district 69%–30% in his Senate race.  In 2005 Democrat Tim Kaine won the district by 70% to 28% in his gubernatorial race.
Race ranking and details from CQ Politics
Campaign contributions from OpenSecrets

District 9

The District covers much of Southwest Virginia. Democratic incumbent Rick Boucher won unopposed for re-election. The Republican Party of Virginia did not list any prospective opponent.

Analysts: CQ Politics rates the seat "safe Democrat".

History: Boucher won by 68%–32% in 2006.   That year Democrat Webb lost the district 44%–55% in his Senate race.  In 2005 Democrat Tim Kaine lost the district by 43% to 55% in his gubernatorial race.
Race ranking and details from CQ Politics
Campaign contributions from OpenSecrets

 District 10 

The District lies in Northern and northwestern Virginia. It covers Loudoun, Prince William and parts of Fairfax and Fauquier counties, as well as Manassas.

Republican incumbent Frank Wolf won against Democratic nominee Judy Feder and Independent Neeraj Nigam in the general election in November 2008.  Feder defeated Mike R. Turner in the June 10, 2008, Democratic primary election by 62% to 38%.Connolly, Wolf, Moran Win Primaries , WRC, 2008-11-06.  On the same day, Wolf faced Vern McKinley in the Republican primary and won with 91% of the vote.

Independent Neeraj Nigam also ran in 2006 and received 0.77%.

Analysts: CQ Politics rates the seat "Republican favored".  The Democratic Congressional Campaign Committee considers Wolf a "targeted Republican". On August 1, the DCCC named Feder as one of its Red to Blue candidates.

History: Wolf defeated Feder in 2006, 57% to 41%. That year Democrat Webb won the district 50.0%–48.8% in his Senate race.  In 2005 Democrat Tim Kaine won the district by 50% to 46% in his gubernatorial race.  In 2004 George W. Bush won 55% of this district.
Race ranking and details from CQ Politics
Campaign contributions from OpenSecrets

District 11

Democratic nominee Gerry Connolly, Chairman of the Fairfax County Board of Supervisors, won against Republican nominee Keith Fimian, a former CPA, and Independent Green candidate Joseph Oddo in this open seat race.

Republican incumbent Thomas M. Davis announced his retirement on January 30, 2008. In 1994 Davis toppled one-term Democrat Leslie L. Byrne and rarely faced serious opposition in intervening years. However, his district, located in the wealthy Northern Virginia suburbs of Washington, DC, has become increasingly Democratic over the years and will definitely be a top Democratic target. George W. Bush barely won this district with 50% to 49% for John Kerry, which includes part of Fairfax and Prince William counties, in 2004.

Fimian has personal wealth that he can draw upon. So far he has self-financed $325,000 of his campaign funds.

Connolly won the June 10, 2008 primary with 58% of the vote, against Leslie L. Byrne (33%), Doug Denneny (6%), and Lori P. Alexander (3%).Connolly Wins Dem Nomination For Davis' Seat , CBS News, 2008-06-10.

Oddo is certified for the ballot. He favors light rail as an alternative to HOT lanes.

Analysts: CQ Politics rates seat "Democrat Favored".  The Cook Political Report rates in "Likely Democratic".  The Rothenberg Political Report scores it "Lean Democratic".

History: Davis won re-election 56%–44% in 2006.  That year Democrat Webb won the district 55%–44% in his Senate race.  In 2005 Democrat Tim Kaine won the district by  56% to 42% in his gubernatorial race.
Race ranking and details from CQ Politics
Campaign contributions from OpenSecrets
Fimian (R) vs Connolly (D) graph of poll results at Pollster.comSee also
 2008 United States House of Representatives elections
 Virginia's congressional districts

References

External links
Virginia State Board of Elections
U.S. Congress candidates for Virginia at Project Vote Smart
Virginia U.S. House Races from 2008 Race TrackerCampaign contributions for Virginia congressional races from OpenSecrets
Campaign contributions from OpenSecretsOfficial campaign websites''
Bill Day Democratic
Rob Wittman  Republican
Nathan Larson Libertarian

Virginia
2008
United States House of Representatives